Huron is a small city in Fresno County, California, in the United States. As of the 2010 census, the population was 6,754, up from 6,306 at the 2000 census. During the harvest season, the population swells to over 15,000 people due to the influx of migrant farm workers. Huron was the city with the highest proportion of Hispanic or Latino people in the United States, according to the 2000 United States Census.

Geography

Climate
According to the Köppen Climate Classification system, Huron has a semi-arid climate, abbreviated "BSk" on climate maps.

History
The community of Huron was founded in 1888 as a water stop along the Southern Pacific Railroad's western route, approximately 15 miles (24 km) northeast of Coalinga. One of the first structures in the community was the Huron Post Office, which operated from 1877 to 1883 and then from 1886 to the present. Huron became a boomtown in the early 20th century and has grown steadily ever since. 
During World War II was the site of three training landing strips called Huron Field, West Field and Indian Field, part of Lemoore Army Air Field.

Historical significance

Joseph Mouren and his family were largely responsible for the expansion of the community of Huron in the late 19th century and fueled the city's growth into the 20th century by investment. Mouren Drive was named after Joseph Mouren, who is considered by many to be one of the city's founding fathers. In the early 20th century, Huron became one of the largest producers of wool in the nation.

Demographics

2010
At the 2010 census Huron had a population of 6,754. The racial makeup of Huron was 2,300 (34.1%) White, 66 (1.0%) African American, 77 (1.1%) Native American, 39 (0.6%) Asian, 6 (0.1%) Pacific Islander, 3,964 (58.7%) from other races, and 302 (4.5%) from two or more races. Hispanic or Latino of any race were 6,527 persons (96.6%).

The whole population lived in households, no one lived in non-institutionalized group quarters and no one was institutionalized.

There were 1,532 households, 1,025 (66.9%) had children under the age of 18 living in them, 813 (53.1%) were opposite-sex married couples living together, 367 (24.0%) had a female householder with no husband present, 155 (10.1%) had a male householder with no wife present.  There were 156 (10.2%) unmarried opposite-sex partnerships, and 14 (0.9%) same-sex married couples or partnerships. 110 households (7.2%) were one person and 40 (2.6%) had someone living alone who was 65 or older. The average household size was 4.41.  There were 1,335 families (87.1% of households); the average family size was 4.47.

The age distribution was 2,506 people (37.1%) under the age of 18, 903 people (13.4%) aged 18 to 24, 1,924 people (28.5%) aged 25 to 44, 1,089 people (16.1%) aged 45 to 64, and 332 people (4.9%) who were 65 or older.  The median age was 24.7 years. For every 100 females, there were 111.6 males.  For every 100 females age 18 and over, there were 114.7 males.

There were 1,602 housing units at an average density of ,of which 1,532 were occupied, 493 (32.2%) by the owners and 1,039 (67.8%) by renters.  The homeowner vacancy rate was 1.8%; the rental vacancy rate was 3.9%.  2,380 people (35.2% of the population) lived in owner-occupied housing units and 4,374 people (64.8%) lived in rental housing units.

2000
At the 2000 census there were 7,836 people in 1,378 households, including 1,208 families, in the city. The racial makeup of the city was 20.36% White, 0.32% Black or African American, 0.98% Native American, 0.40% Asian, 0.13% Pacific Islander, 74.77% from other races, and 3.04% from two or more races.  98.6% of the population were Hispanic or Latino of any race.
The greatest percentage of farmland surrounding Huron is devoted to the production of lettuce, onions and tomatoes. During the harvest season, it is not uncommon for the population of the city to swell to over 15,000 people.

Of the 1,378 households 64.0% had children under the age of 18 living with them, 58.9% were married couples living together, 18.9% had a female householder with no husband present, and 12.3% were non-families. 7.4% of households were one person and 3.6% were one person aged 65 or older.  The average household size was 4.45 and the average family size was 4.44.

The age distribution was 39.1% under the age of 18, 13.8% from 18 to 24, 30.2% from 25 to 44, 12.7% from 45 to 64, and 4.2% 65 or older.  The median age was 24 years. For every 100 females, there were 125.8 males.  For every 100 females age 18 and over, there were 131.5 males.

The median household income was $24,609 and the median family income  was $23,939. Males had a median income of $21,656 versus $16,442 for females. The per capita income for the city was $9,425.  About 38.3% of families and 39.4% of the population were below the poverty line, including 48.4% of those under age 18 and 10.7% of those age 65 or over.

Schools

The city of Huron is within the Coalinga-Huron Unified School District.
The schools in Huron are:
 Huron Elementary School (Grades K-5)
 Huron Middle School (Grades 6–8)
 Fresno EOC Headstart Program
 Fresno-Madera Migrant Headstart Program

Huron Police Department
The City of Huron currently funds its own police department.

Water issues
In July 2009, action by the Federal Bureau of Reclamation to protect threatened fish reduced irrigation pumping to parts of the California Central Valley, causing canals leading into Huron and the surrounding areas and the farms that rely on them to dry up. Unemployment has reached over 40% as farms dried up. Governor Schwarzenegger stated the federal action is putting the fish "above the needs of millions of Californians." The issue received coverage on the Hannity program from Fox News broadcasting from Huron. Comedian Paul Rodriguez acted as a celebrity spokesperson criticizing the action, as his mother owns a farm in the area. Fox's coverage of the issue has been criticized, and the California Progress Report argued that Huron's problems are more the result of poor water management decisions by the local water district than by the federal government. Environmental and fishing groups have argued that the action to protect fish will ultimately save more jobs in the fishing and tourism industries than will be lost in agriculture.

References

Incorporated cities and towns in California
Cities in Fresno County, California
Populated places established in 1888